Michael Charles Brantley Sr. (born June 17, 1961) is an American former professional baseball player. He was the hitting coach for the Toronto Blue Jays of Major League Baseball (MLB) from early  to September .

Early life
Brantley grew up in Catskill, New York, the sixth of eleven children—seven boys, four girls. His father was a foundry worker and his mother was a homemaker. He attended Catskill High School. Brantley went on to attend Columbia-Greene Community College, starred in soccer, basketball, and baseball, and still holds several school records. After one year at CGCC, he starred at Coastal Carolina University, and after his senior season, in 1983, was drafted by the Seattle Mariners in the second round (#30 overall).

Career

As player
Brantley played outfield and designated hitter during parts of four seasons, 1986–1989, all for the Seattle Mariners. His only full season as a regular came in  when he hit .263 with 15 HR and 56 RBI in 149 games. He spent the – seasons with several teams in the minor leagues, finally finishing his playing career with the Yomiuri Giants in Japan.

As coach and manager
Prior to the  2005 season Brantley was named as the first base coach for the Toronto Blue Jays. After Mike Barnett was dismissed three weeks into the season, Brantley replaced him as the hitting coach. Brantley was released near the end of the 2007 season, as the Jays' offense that year was less productive than expected.

Personal life
Brantley's son, Michael Brantley, plays for the Houston Astros as an outfielder, and participated in the 2019 and 2021 World Series. His nephew, Justin Brantley, was a pitcher in the Indians organization from 2014 to 2017. Justin signed a minor league contract with the New York Mets and released in 2017. In the early 1980s, teenage boxer Mike Tyson lived with Brantley and his family. After 17 years of marriage to Nina Brantley, Mickey and Nina divorced.

References

External links 

 Espn.com player profile
 Basketball-reference Stats

1961 births
Living people
African-American baseball coaches
African-American baseball managers
African-American baseball players
African-American soccer players
American expatriate baseball players in Canada
American expatriate baseball players in Japan
American men's basketball players
Bakersfield Mariners players
Baseball coaches from New York (state)
Baseball players from New York (state)
Basketball players from New York (state)
Calgary Cannons players
Chattanooga Lookouts players
Coastal Carolina Chanticleers baseball players
Columbia–Greene Twins baseball players
Columbia–Greene Twins men's basketball players
Denver Zephyrs players
Junior college men's soccer players in the United States
Leones del Caracas players
American expatriate baseball players in Venezuela
Major League Baseball designated hitters
Major League Baseball outfielders
Minor league baseball managers
Nashville Sounds players
New York Mets coaches
Nippon Professional Baseball outfielders
People from Catskill, New York
Phoenix Firebirds players
Salt Lake City Gulls players
Seattle Mariners players
Soccer players from New York (state)
Toronto Blue Jays coaches
Tucson Toros players
Yomiuri Giants players
21st-century African-American people
20th-century African-American sportspeople
Association footballers not categorized by position
Association football players not categorized by nationality